The National Treasury of the Republic of Kenya is the Kenyan government ministry which formulates financial and economic policies and oversees effective coordination of Government financial operations.

See also
Kenya
Minister for Finance (Kenya)

References

External links
 Ministry of Finance, Kenya

Kenya
Kenya